Michael Alan Ratney (born 1961) is an American diplomat who currently serves in the United States Department of State. He previously served as the Chargé d'Affaires of the United States Embassy in Israel. He is the nominee to serve as the next United States ambassador to Saudi Arabia.

Early life and education 

Raised in Massachusetts, Ratney is a 1979 graduate of Bedford High School. He has a Bachelor of Science in Mass Communication from Boston University and a Master of Arts in International Affairs from the George Washington University.

Career 
Ratney is a career member of the Senior Foreign Service, with the rank of Minister-Counselor. He joined the service in 1990. He currently serves as the Acting Deputy Director of the U.S. Department of State’s Foreign Service Institute. His most recent assignment before this was Chargé d’Affaires a.i. at the U.S. Embassy in Jerusalem. Ratney served as the Dean of the School of Language Studies at the Foreign Service Institute. He was previously on the National Defense University faculty. He served as the State Department’s Acting Deputy Assistant Secretary for the Levant and Israel and Palestinian Affairs, and was the U.S. Special Envoy for Syria. Earlier, Ratney was the U.S. Consul General in Jerusalem. He was the Deputy Assistant Secretary for International Media in the State Department’s Bureau of Public Affairs. Prior to this, he served as a spokesman for the State Department’s Bureau of Near Eastern Affairs. Other assignments include serving as Deputy Chief of Mission at the U.S. Embassy in Doha, Qatar, as well as tours in Mexico City, Baghdad, Beirut, Casablanca, Bridgetown, and Washington, D.C.

Nomination as U.S. ambassador to Saudi Arabia 

On April 22, 2022, President Joe Biden announced his intent to nominate Ratney to be the next United States ambassador to Saudi Arabia. On April 25, 2022, his nomination was sent to the Senate. Hearings on his nomination were held before the Senate Foreign Relations Committee on June 16, 2022. The committee favorably reported his nomination to the Senate floor on June 23, 2022.

On September 28, 2022, Democratic Senator Ron Wyden placed a hold on Ratney's nomination due to a Saudi national killing Fallon Smart, a teenager from Wyden's home state of Oregon. The Saudi national responsible for Smart's death was reportedly aided by the Saudi government in fleeing the United States, and Wyden urged any ambassador to Saudi Arabia to make this a priority. His nomination expired at the end of the year and was returned to President Biden on January 3, 2023.

President Biden renominated Ratney the same day. On February 24, 2022, Senator Marco Rubio placed a hold on Ratney's nomination. His nomination is pending before the Senate Foreign Relations Committee.

Awards and recognitions
Ratney has won multiple State Department performance awards, including a Presidential Meritorious Service award.

Personal life
Ratney is married to fellow Foreign Service Officer Karen Sasahara; she is the current nominee to be the next US Ambassador to Kuwait. Ratney speaks Arabic and French.

References

External links

|-

|-

1961 births
Living people
Place of birth missing (living people)
American consuls
Bedford High School (Massachusetts) alumni
Boston University College of Communication alumni
Elliott School of International Affairs alumni
United States Foreign Service personnel
United States Special Envoys